Jéferson Luis Corrêa Carpes (born 5 November 1983), commonly known as Jé, is a Brazilian futsal player who plays for Jaraguá as a Pivot.

References

1983 births
Living people
Brazilian men's futsal players
Foolad Mahan FSC players
ElPozo Murcia FS players
ADC Intelli players
Sportspeople from Porto Alegre